Marlon Chircop (born 5 August 1991), better known by his artist name Lon Kirkop, is a Maltese novelist, playwright and visual artist. He won The Literary Contest Of Novels For Youth 2020, organised by the National Book Council and Aġenzija Żgħażagħ, with his debut novel Mitt Elf Isem Ieħor: HappyVeganGirlJules (Maltese for "A Hundred Thousand Other Names: HappyVeganGirlJules") later published by Merlin publishers.

Biography 
Kirkop was born on 5 August 1991, in Malta. His love affair with art, literature and theatre dates to his childhood. Today he managed to find a way to incorporate all his passions into his continuously developing multidisciplinary work. Kirkop studied at MCAST's Creative Arts Institute and graduated with a B.A.(Hons) in fine arts, in 2017. In 2022, he graduated with an M.A. in printmaking at Cambridge School of Arts, UK.

In 2018, he had his first solo visual art show at La Bottega Art Bistro in Valletta, curated by Lily Agius Gallery where he exhibited a selection of layered mesh painting, a technique he invented himself through artistic experimentation, with a hard to define aesthetics. When in an interview was asked about his work's aesthetics, he replied:"Most of the time my aesthetic changes according to the subject and medium used. Aesthetically, this series I’m presenting in this exhibition is so different to what I have produced so far that it is hard to define. However, textures and layers somehow always feature in my work, regardless of the theme. It is not always intentional, but I have to admit that I am obsessed with the notion of layering and exploring different materials."From time to time, Lon join forces with another two visual artists Hannah Galea and Serah Stringer, who are collectively known as The Peculiars, and exhibit their work together tackling social and controversial subjects. In 2022, he was one of the selected artists for the Woolwich Contemporary Print Fair.

Kirkop debut as a playwright during the Cospicua Short Play Festival 2019 with three different plays: FIl-Ħajja li Jmiss (Maltese for "Another Life"), Limbu (Maltese for "Limbo") and Elektra, where he won best script writing for the play Elektra.  Since then, he wrote his first young adult novel Mitt Elf Isem Ieħor: HappyVeganGirlJules (Maltese for "A Hundred Thousand Other Names: HappyVeganGirlJules") and won the Literary Contest Of Novels For Youth in 2020, and in October 2021, this novel was published by Merlin Publishers. The novel become an instant success not only with teens but also with adults and received positive feedback from both critics and readers, especially for its fresh voice, pace and provocative content. Kirkop's debut novel turned out to be a surprise hit during the Malta Book Festival 2021. In an interview with Times Of Malta, Kirkop stated that he is not surprised that his novel is also proving popular with adults. He said "I cannot say I am surprised that it’s also doing well with adults. Although it explores the struggles of being a teenager in a world obsessed with social media, it’s also about relationships between family members and friends while touching upon social issues that affect many people irrelevant of their age."

On the novel, the Maltese blogger/book reviewer Robert Pisani from The Bobsphere wrote:“I’ve read quite a few novels about social media culture and behaviour. At this point, Mitt Elf Isem Ieħor is probably my favourite one.”Lon wrote the lyrics of the song Fittixni, that was one of the Finalist in the song contest Mużika Mużika: Festival tal-Kanzunetta Maltija. The song was written with the Maltese composer Gilbert "Bibi" Camilleri and performed by Victoria Sciberras.

The song Fil-Kexxun, which he wrote both the music and lyrics for, won the 46th edition of L-Għanja tal-Poplu.

His second book Fil-Ħajja Li Jmiss u Drammi Oħra tat-Triq, a collection of short plays, was published by Merlin Publishers on the 27th of September 2022.

Lon Kirkop was one of the selected artists at the Woolwich Contemporary Print Fair 2022 with his lithography print Out of Focus.

Works

Publications 
 Fil-Ħajja Li Jmiss u Drammi Oħra tat-Triq (Another Life and other Street Plays), 2022 - Collection of short plays
 Mitt Elf Isem Ieħor: HappyVeganGirlJules (A Hundred Thousand Other Names: HappyVeganGirlJules), 2021 - Young Adult Novel

Multidisciplinary Work 

 Lura F'Ġuf Ommi (Maltese for Back Into My Mother's Womb), 2022 - lithography prints, music, poetry, projections and live performance
 Ċella ta’ Wieħed (Maltese for A cell for one), 2022 - this work is an iteration of the work Lura F'Ġuf Ommi.

Stage plays 
 Fil-Ħajja li Jmiss (Another Life), 2019 - short play
 Limbu (Limbo), 2019 - short play
 Elektra, 2019 - short play
 Liżar Roża (Pink Sheets), 2021 - short play
 'l Alla ta' Wara l-Ħġieġa (The God of the Screen), 2021 - short play
 Passi mill-Kuritur (Steps from the Corridor ), 2021

Songs 
 "Fil-Kexxun", 2022 - music and lyrics (winner of l-Għanja tal-Poplu 2022)
 "Fittixni" (Search for me), 2022 - lyrics

Visual work 

 Out of Focus, 2022 - Lithography print

References 

1991 births
Living people
Maltese novelists
Maltese male novelists
21st-century Maltese novelists